Sean Dominic Martin (born August 18) is a Spanish-American television actor. He is recognized for playing the recurring role of recording producer Martin Jabari Johnson on the American mystery series, Greenleaf. Since 2019, he has played the role of Nate Hastings on the soap opera The Young and the Restless.

Dominic was born in Madrid. As a child, Dominic was a dancer, singer and a performer in stage plays. He began his career where Dominic first acted in a commercial in Atlanta, Georgia and New York. Dominic earned his first credited television appearance in the comedy-drama television series Royal Pains in 2009. He also held recurring roles on Greenleaf, Situationships and Makeup X Breakup.

In 2018, Dominic starred in the action movie Running Out Of Time as the character Clarence with Tasha Smith and RonReaco Lee.

In 2019, Dominic was cast as Nate Hastings on The Young and the Restless, first appearing in the April 10, 2019, episode. He replaced Brooks Darnell for the role.

References

External links 

Rotten Tomatoes profile
CBS profile

Living people
Year of birth missing (living people)
People from Madrid
Male actors from Madrid
American male stage actors
American male television actors
American male soap opera actors
21st-century American male actors
21st-century African-American people
Spanish emigrants to the United States
American dancers
American child singers